Get Up is the thirteenth studio album by Canadian singer-songwriter Bryan Adams, released physically in Australia and New Zealand on October 2 and worldwide on October 16, 2015, by Universal Music. Produced by ELO frontman Jeff Lynne and co-written with his long-time collaborator Jim Vallance, the album features nine new songs and four acoustic versions (total 13 tracks). The first single released was "You Belong to Me" featuring a music video. It was shot and directed by Adams using his black and white photography style, with only his guitar and "a muse" to assist him.

Background
Universal announced the release of the album on August 10, 2015. "You Belong to Me" was released digitally on the same date as an "instant-grat track". Get Up is Bryan Adams' first studio album consisting of only original material since 11 (2008), following the release of covers album, Tracks of My Years (which contained one original song) in 2014. Adams has said of the album, "It came together quite organically, song by song, working with Jeff producing over the past couple of years whenever he had time. It was a great partnership as it gave me plenty of time to write the songs, most of which are a collaboration with Jim Vallance. We all worked primarily over the internet from Canada, Europe and LA, sending demos and parts of songs until we got it right." Of working with Jeff Lynne, Adams said: "He sort of becomes a member of the band. In this case, on the majority of the tracks he produced on this album, he is the band."

Singles
The album's lead single, "Brand New Day" was then released on September 7, 2015. Bryan Adams has said of the song: "That was the last song written for the record, and it’s about getting motivated, about getting up and do something with yourself. But it’s also about the idea that the grass is always greener on the other side. Or is it?" The music video, directed by Adams, features British actress Helena Bonham Carter and Theo Hutchcraft.

"You Belong to Me" was released as the album's second single in November 2015 along with the music video, directed by Adams, the song was added to BBC Radio 2's playlist during November and December 2015.

The third single "Do What Ya Gotta Do" debuted on the radio in February 2016 along with the music video, directed by Adams, on February 17, 2016.

"Don't Even Try" was released as the album's fourth single on July 5, 2016, along with the music video, directed by Adams, premiering the same day. This video features British comedian David Walliams as the unruly guitarist in the band.

Track listing

Charts

Weekly charts

Year-end charts

Certifications

References

Bryan Adams albums
2015 albums
Albums produced by Jeff Lynne